The 2006 CAF Beach Soccer championship also known as the 2006 FIFA Beach Soccer World Cup qualifiers for (CAF) was the first beach soccer championship for Africa, held in September 2006, in Durban, South Africa.
Cameroon won the championship, with Nigeria finishing second. The two moved on to play in the 2006 FIFA Beach Soccer World Cup in Rio de Janeiro, Brazil from November 2 - November 12.

Competing nations

 (hosts)

Group stage

Group A

Group B

Knockout stage

Winners

Final standings

References 

Beach
International association football competitions hosted by South Africa
FIFA Beach Soccer World Cup qualification (CAF)
2006–07 in South African soccer
2006 in beach soccer